The Mangles River is in the South Island of New Zealand. Its main tributary is the Tutaki River but it is also fed by water flowing off the Braeburn Range. It feeds into the Buller River near the town of Murchison.  The river is popular destination for kayaking and trout fishing.

William Fox was the New Zealand Company agent in Nelson when he explored the Buller as far south as Murchison in February 1846, with Thomas Brunner and Charles Heaphy. They renamed the lower section of the Tiraumea River, after the English MP, Ross Donnelly Mangles, one of the company's directors. The official name was gazetted as Mangles River on 27 May 2021.

River pollution has been monitored since 2016. About 75% of the catchment is in native forest, so that water quality is generally good, the only exception being nitrates.

The river is bridged by SH6 near its confluence with the Buller.

References 

Rivers of the Tasman District
Rivers of New Zealand